The Riverina Football Association was an Australian rules football competition formed in 1924 from the following clubs - Balldale, Brocklesby Culcairn, Henty Town, Henty Rovers, Holbrook and Walla Walla.

History
The Riverina Football Association was an Australian Rules Football competition formed in 1924 from the following clubs - Balldale, Brocklesby Culcairn, Henty Town, Henty Rovers, Holbrook and Walla Walla that was active for only six football seasons, up until 1929.

Interestingly, there was a Riverina Main Line Football Association that was formed in 1922 and based in Wagga Wagga. The seven club's that made up this competition were - Culcairn, Henty, Mangoplah, Wagga Federals, Wagga Newtown, Wagga Stars and Yerong Creek. This competition was only in existence for one season, with the Wagga Stars defeating Yerong Creek in the Grand Final. On the eve of the final series Culcairn, Henty, and Mangoplah withdrew from the competition, citing the fact the association refused to provide a VFL umpire for the final series.

In 1923 Mangoplah applied to re-enter the Wagga United Football Association, but the other clubs voted against them. Mangoplah then joined the Yerong Creek & District Football Association and won the minor premiership but lost their semifinal match to Culcairn. Mangoplah, as the minor premiers, exercised their right to challenge the "final" winners. Mangoplah played Culcairn in the Grand Final at Yerong Creek and won the YC&DFA premiership.

Brocklesby's golden era was certainly in the 1920s, when the club played in nine consecutive grand finals between 1923 and 1931, but only won two premierships during this successful period in 1924 and 1928, both in the Riverina Football Association.

In 1927, Culcairn secured the services of Carlton VFL player, Bill Koop as their captain-coach.

Clubs
Balldale: (blue with a gold sash guernsey) 1924 - 1929. Played the Corowa & District Football Association from 1930 to 1934.
Brocklesby: (blue with a white band guernsey) 1924 - 1929. Joined in 1924 after being runners up to Burrumbuttock in the Hume Football Association. Was runner up in Corowa & District Football Association in 1930, then played in the Albury & District Football League in 1931 (runners up) and 1932.
Culcairn: (maroon & blue guernsey) 1924 - 1929. Played in the Albury & District Football League from 1930 to 1940.
Henty: (red & white vertical strips guernsey) 1925 - 1929. Played in the Albury & District Football League from 1930 to 1940.
Henty Rovers: 1924. A new team, merged with Henty Imperials to form Henty FC in 1925.  
Henty Imperials: 1924. Merged with Henty Rovers to form Henty FC in 1925. 
Holbrook: (Green & Gold vertical strips guernsey) 1924 - 1929. Played in the Albury & District Football League from 1930 to 1940.
Walla Ramblers: 1925. Club folded prior the 1926 season.
Walla Walla: (green guernsey, with white collar) 1924 - 1929. Joined from the Hume Football Association in 1924, then played in the Central Hume Football Association from 1930 to 1934.
Yerong Creek: 1925. Joined The Rock & District Football Association in 1926.

Teams in Association per year
1924: 7 - Balldale, Brocklesby, Culcairn, Henty Imperials, Henty Rovers, Holbrook, Walla Walla.
1925: 8 - Balldale, Brocklesby, Culcairn, Henty, Holbrook, Walla Walla, Walla Ramblers, Yerong Creek.
1926: 6 - Balldale, Brocklesby, Culcairn, Henty, Holbrook, Walla Walla.
1927: 6 - Balldale, Brocklesby, Culcairn, Henty, Holbrook, Walla Walla.
1928: 6 - Balldale, Brocklesby, Culcairn, Henty, Holbrook, Walla Walla.
1929: 6 - Balldale, Brocklesby, Culcairn, Henty, Holbrook, Walla Walla.

Football Grand Finals

 Don Davis from the Brocklesby Hotel, donated the premiership cup in 1924.
 Tooth & Co. Ltd donated a premiership cup in 1925.

Officer Bearers

See also
Albury & District Football League 
Central Hume Football Association
Central Riverina Football League
Coreen & District Football League
Farrer Football League
Hume Football Netball League
South West Football League (New South Wales)

References

Australian rules football in Australia
Defunct Australian rules football competitions in New South Wales
Sport in the Riverina
Sports leagues established in 1924
1924 establishments in Australia
1929 disestablishments in Australia
Australian rules football competitions